Douglas Gabriel (born August 27, 1980) is a former American football wide receiver. He was drafted by the Oakland Raiders in the fifth round of the 2003 NFL Draft. He played college football at UCF.

Gabriel was also a member of the New England Patriots, Cincinnati Bengals, Florida Tuskers, California Redwoods, and Sacramento Mountain Lions.

Early years
Gabriel attended Dr. Phillips High School in Orlando, Florida and was a letterman in football.  As a senior, he won All-Conference and All-State honors as a wide receiver.

College career
Gabriel finalized his storied high school career but was academically unable to enroll at Miami (Fla.) or Oregon State or any large school where he was recruited. He enrolled at Mississippi Gulf Coast Community College (MGCCC) in Perkinston, MS where he had a breakout 2000 fall season and made passing grades in the classroom, refocusing on playing at a larger university. Gabriel signed with and attended the University of Central Florida and was a two-year letterman in football.  He finished his stellar college football career with 97 receptions for 1,869 yards and 20 touchdowns and added 795 yards on 37 kickoff returns (21.5 avg.).  His 1,869 receiving yards rank ninth on the school's career-record list while his 20 receiving touchdowns rank fifth.

Professional career

First stint with Raiders
Gabriel was selected by the Raiders in the fifth-round (167th overall) of the 2003 NFL Draft. He played in Oakland until he was traded to the Patriots during the 2006 season.

New England Patriots
In 2006, Gabriel appeared in 12 games (five starts) for the Patriots and caught 25 passes for 344 yards and three touchdowns. He was released by the team on December 12, 2006.

Second stint with Raiders
A day after being released by the Patriots, Gabriel re-signed with the Raiders. Gabriel appeared in three games for the team that season, catching five passes for 84 yards. On August 27, 2007, the Raiders released him.

Cincinnati Bengals
After spending the 2007 season out of football, Gabriel signed with the Cincinnati Bengals on April 8, 2008. He was released by the team on May 29.

United Football League
Gabriel was signed by the Florida Tuskers of the United Football League on August 25, 2009. After being dropped from the Tuskers prior to the team's first game, Gabriel signed on with another UFL team, the California Redwoods, on October 12. Gabriel signed with the Sacramento Mountain Lions for the 2010 UFL season.

Post-playing career
Gabriel became offensive coordinator at East River High School (Fla.) HS in 2013, then became head football coach in September 2014 on an interim basis after the previous head coach resigned under pressure. In August 2015, Gabriel denied a rumor that he was leaving East River to take an internship with the Oakland Raiders.

See also
 List of NCAA major college football yearly receiving leaders

References

External links
New England Patriots bio
Oakland Raiders bio
United Football League bio
Just Sports Stats

1980 births
Living people
Players of American football from Miami
American football wide receivers
Mississippi Gulf Coast Bulldogs football players
UCF Knights football players
Oakland Raiders players
New England Patriots players
Cincinnati Bengals players
Florida Tuskers players
Sacramento Mountain Lions players
Orlando Predators players
Dr. Phillips High School alumni